The 1857 Ohio gubernatorial election was held on October 13, 1857. Incumbent Republican Salmon P. Chase defeated Democratic nominee Henry B. Payne with 48.67% of the vote.

General election

Candidates
Major party candidates
Salmon P. Chase, Republican 
Henry B. Payne, Democratic

Other candidates
Philadelph Van Trump, American

Results

References

1857
Ohio